Camille Japy (born 7 September 1968) is a Belgian-French actress. She has appeared in more than seventy films since 1990.

Selected filmography

References

External links 

1968 births
Living people
Belgian film actresses
French film actresses
Belgian stage actresses
French stage actresses
French television actresses
20th-century French actresses
21st-century French actresses